Edgmer Eduarado Escalona (born October 6, 1986) is a Venezuelan professional baseball pitcher who is a free agent. He played for the Colorado Rockies of Major League Baseball.

Career

Colorado Rockies
Escalona began his professional career in 2006, playing for the DSL Rockies, going 0-2 with a 7.11 ERA in 14 games. In 2007, he went 1-1 with a 4.05 ERA in 18 relief appearances for the Casper Rockies, and in 2008 he went 6-2 with a 3.22 ERA in 44 appearances for the Asheville Tourists. Escalona split the 2009 season between the Modesto Nuts (28 games) and Tulsa Drillers (38 games), going a combined 3-2 with a 2.47 ERA in 59 games.

Escalona began the 2010 season with the Triple-A Colorado Springs Sky Sox.  He was called up to the majors in May 2010, but he was sent back to Triple-A the next day without appearing. Escalona was called up to the majors on September 3, 2010. His first appearance came against the Diamondbacks on the 10th, and he pitched a scoreless inning. His first strikeout was of Ryan Ludwick. He pitched 6 innings in 5 appearances for the Rockies in 2010, giving up 1 run and striking out 2.

After spending April in extended spring training, Escalona began 2011 with Colorado Springs, where he pitched May and June before being recalled on July 1 due to a need of pitchers. After pitching a scoreless inning, he was optioned back down. Escalona was recalled after Ubaldo Jiménez was traded, and he spent almost a month before getting placed on the disabled list with a right rotator cuff strain. He returned on September 9, and finished the season with Colorado. In 14 appearances, he had a 1.75 ERA, striking out 14 in 25.2 innings.

Escalona was among the final spring cuts for the Opening Day roster, and he began with Colorado Springs. On April 17, he was recalled by the Rockies. After pitching in 7 games, he was optioned back to Colorado Springs, where he spent the next 3 months until he was recalled on August 4 to replace Christian Friedrich. After going on the disabled list with right elbow inflammation 2 appearances later, Escalona returned on September 2 and finished the year with Colorado. After a very solid September, he lowered his season ERA from 11.88 to 6.04. In 22 appearances with the Rockies, Escalona went 0-1 with 2 holds, striking out 21 in 22.1 innings.

Escalona made his first Opening Day roster in 2013, and got the win in his first appearance of 2013. On June 11, Escalona was placed on the disabled list, and he returned on July 2. On August 23, Escalona was designated for assignment. He was outrighted off the roster on August 29. In 37 games, he went 1-4 with 7 holds and a 5.67 ERA, striking out 34 in 46 innings.

Baltimore Orioles
Escalona signed a one-year deal with the Baltimore Orioles on November 20, 2013.

New York Yankees
He signed a minor league deal with the New York Yankees on July 2, 2014. He was released on April 4, 2015.

Saraperos de Saltillo
He signed with them for the 2015 season. He was released on June 6, 2016.

Acereros de Monclova
On June 13, 2016, Escalona signed with the Acereros de Monclova of the Mexican Baseball League. He was released on January 10, 2017.

Vaqueros Unión Laguna
On June 22, 2017, Escalona signed with the Vaqueros Unión Laguna of the Mexican Baseball League. He was released on July 10, 2017.

Guerreros de Oaxaca
On May 22, 2022, after spending multiple years only playing in the Venezuelan Professional Baseball League, Escalona returned to the Mexican League by signing with the Guerreros de Oaxaca. In 3 starts, he posted a 0–1 record with a 9.42 ERA over 14.2 innings. Escalona was released on June 5, 2022.

See also

 List of Major League Baseball players from Venezuela

References

External links

1986 births
Living people
Acereros de Monclova players
Asheville Tourists players
Casper Rockies players
Colorado Rockies players
Colorado Springs Sky Sox players
Dominican Summer League Rockies players
Guerreros de Oaxaca players
Venezuelan expatriate baseball players in the Dominican Republic
Leones del Caracas players
Major League Baseball pitchers
Major League Baseball players from Venezuela
Mexican League baseball pitchers
Modesto Nuts players
Norfolk Tides players
Saraperos de Saltillo players
Scranton/Wilkes-Barre RailRiders players
Tiburones de La Guaira players
Tulsa Drillers players
Vaqueros Unión Laguna players
Venezuelan expatriate baseball players in Mexico
Venezuelan expatriate baseball players in the United States